Barva Volcano is an andesitic stratovolcano complex in central Costa Rica, 22 km north of San José, in Heredia Province. On the eastern side of the mountain it has a lake in what was the volcanic crater, called "Laguna de Barva", and in the western side it has three hills on the top which are called "Las Tres Marías". It is located in the small agricultural community of Sacramento.

Barva has several eruptive centres at its summit and many parasitic cones on its flanks. Its three principal summits visible from the Central Valley give it the common local name of Las Tres Marías (The Three Marys).

Four pyroclastic cones are present within the 2 x 3 km caldera at the central and northwestern part of the summit. The southwestern peak contains four cones, one of which has a crater lake.

The last confirmed eruptive activity at Barva Volcano has been dated to 8,050 years ago. There were reports of eruptions in the 1760s and in 1867, but investigations at the summit did not find evidence to confirm the reports.

References

Sources
Costa Rican National Seismological Network: Barva

Stratovolcanoes of Costa Rica
Mountains of Costa Rica
Geography of Heredia Province